Theodore II can refer to:

 Theodore II, Exarch of Ravenna in 677–687
 Patriarch Theodore II of Alexandria (Coadjutor), Greek Patriarch of Alexandria between the 7th and 8th centuries
 Pope Theodore II who reigned for twenty days during December 897
 Theodore II of Constantinople, Ecumenical Patriarch in 1214–1216
 Theodore II Laskaris, emperor of Nicaea (Byzantine Emperor in exile), 1254–1258
 Theodore II Palaiologos (c.1396–1448), Despot of the Morea from 1407 to 1443
 Theodore II, Marquess of Montferrat (died 1418), also of the Palaiologos dynasty
 Tewodros II of Ethiopia, Theodore II, Emperor of Ethiopia, 1855–1868
 Patriarch Theodore II of Alexandria (born 1954), current (since 2004) Eastern Orthodox Patriarch of Alexandria
 Pope Theodoros II of Alexandria, Pope of the Coptic Orthodox Church of Alexandria (since 2012)

See also
Feodor II of Russia